X Games XIII (13) took place from August 2–5, 2007 in Los Angeles, California at the Staples Center and the Home Depot Center. It was broadcast on the ESPN networks, EXPN.com and ABC.

Events included:
Motocross (Racing, Step Up, Supermoto, Freestyle and Best Trick)
Skateboarding (Big Air, Vert, Street and Street Best Trick)
BMX (Big Air, Park, Vert)
Surfing (Men and Women)
Rallying

Highlights and results

Day 1 – Thursday, August 2
Jake Brown lost his board on his way up the quarterpipe during a skateboard run in the Big Air contest, falling over 40 feet to the floor. Incredibly, he managed to walk away from the fall, but suffered a bruised liver, fractured wrist and bruised lung. In replays, it was shown that he changed direction at the last second which forced his back foot to push the board away from him. This allowed him and his board to follow in different directions. Jake Brown would be released from the hospital on August 4 and was at the Moto X Freestyle preliminaries though he was walking with a cane.

Men's Skateboard Big Air

In the Moto X Best Trick competition, Scott Murray attempted the double backflip on his motorcycle, but came up short. The bike was damaged beyond repair for a second run.
Kyle Loza wins the Best Trick competition with a body varial trick he calls "The Volt".

Day 2 – Friday, August 3

Men's Skateboard Street

Women's Skateboard Vert

Women's Skateboard Street

Kevin Robinson wins Gold in the BMX Big Air competition, reaching a height above the vert ramp of at least 20 feet. Mat Hoffman returned to compete in Big Air after a 5-year hiatus.

BMX Big Air

Moto X Step Up

Note: This was the first year that competitors had to win to get a medal.

Day 3 – Saturday, August 4

BMX Park

BMX Vert

Moto X Racing

Moto X Freestyle

Moto X Super Moto

Day 4 – Sunday, August 5

Men's Skateboard Vert

This year introduced a new rule that stated that once a rider "bailed" or had fallen, their run was over, reinforcing the medal contention.

Rallying

Pastrana/Edström were disqualified in the semifinals after crossing into their competitors' lane just before the finish against Foust/Beavis. Pastrana defeated Ramana Lagemann for the bronze medal.  Lagemann replaced Colin McRae in the bronze race because McRae's car was too heavily damaged.

External links
EXPN.com

X Games in Los Angeles
2007 in American sports
2007 in rallying
2007 in multi-sport events